Members of the New South Wales Legislative Council who served in the 57th Parliament were elected at the 2015 and 2019 elections. As members serve eight-year terms, half of the Council was elected in 2015 and did not face re-election in 2019, and the members elected in 2019 will not face re-election until 2027. The President was John Ajaka until March 2021 and then Matthew Mason-Cox from May 2021.

References

Members of New South Wales parliaments by term
21st-century Australian politicians
New South Wales Legislative Council